Shuanglong Town is a rural town in Huayuan County, Xiangxi Tujia and Miao Autonomous Prefecture, in northwestern Hunan, China.  it had a population of 29,000 and an area of .

History
On November 3, 2013, Chinese Communist Party general secretary Xi Jinping explored the Shibadong Village, where he first put forward the scheme of the "targeted poverty alleviation". Shibadong Village became a testing ground for the new initiative in since Xi's investigation.

On November 30, 2015, Pailiao Township, Paibi Township and Dongmaku Township merged to form the Shuanglong Town.

Geography
Zixia Lake is a lake and the largest body of water in the town.

The Ancient Miao River flows through the town.

Economy
Special local products such as native chicken, mushrooms, Miao embroidery are important to the economy.

Kiwifruit and cattle rearing are also the source of revenue.

Transportation
 Jishou-Chaling Expressway
 National Highway G209
 National Highway G319

Attractions
The Yelang Shiba Cave is a karst cave in the town and became a tourist attraction in 2016.

References

Divisions of Huayuan County
Towns of Xiangxi Tujia and Miao Autonomous Prefecture